Bingbot is a web-crawling robot (type of internet bot), deployed by Microsoft October 2010 to supply Bing. It collects documents from the web to build a searchable index for the Bing (search engine).  It performs the same function as Google's Googlebot.

This appears in the web server logs to tell the webmaster who is requesting a file. Each webmaster is able to use the included agent identifier, "bingbot", to disallow or allow access to their site (by default access is allowed). If they don't want to grant access they can use the Robots Exclusion Standard to block it (relying on the assumed good behaviour of bingbot), or use other server specific means (relying on the web server to do the blocking).

References

External links
Bing crawler: bingbot on the horizon
Bingbot is coming to town

Internet bots
Web crawlers